Robert "Robbie" Greville (born 1994) is an Irish hurler who plays as a left wing-back for the Westmeath minor and senior teams.

Greville made his first appearance for the team during the 2012 championship and immediately became a regular member of the starting fifteen.

At club level Greville plays with the Raharney club.

References

1994 births
Living people
Raharney hurlers
Westmeath inter-county hurlers